Gaspare Venturini (Ferrara, documented between 1576 and 1593) was an Italian painter.

Biography
Venturini was trained in the school of Ferrarese Mannerism together with Bastarolo and Scarsellino, his associates together with the Carracci in the decoration of the ceilings of the Palazzo dei Diamanti over the decade between 1580 and 1590. Late 16th-century in style and rooted in the area of Ferrara, Venturini works are of mostly a religious character, as exemplified by the altarpieces for the church of the Madonnina and the Miracle of Saint Apollinaris in San Cristoforo della Certosa.

References
 Domenico Sedini, Gaspare Venturini , online catalogue Artgate by Fondazione Cariplo, 2010, CC BY-SA (source for the first revision of this article).

Other projects

16th-century Italian painters
Italian male painters
Painters from Ferrara
Year of birth unknown
Year of death unknown
Mannerist painters